Aleksandar Sabev (born 9 April 1988) is a Bulgarian footballer currently playing as a defender for Chavdar Etropole.

Career
Sabev was raised in CSKA Sofia's youth teams. In season 2007/2008 he was loaned in Rilski Sportist Samokov and played in 25 matches with this team in Bulgarian second division.
Made his official debut for CSKA in the last match of 2008–09 season in the Bulgarian A PFG (Professional Football Group) against Lokomotiv Mezdra.

International career
In May 2007 the Bulgarian national under-21 coach Aleksandar Stankov called Aleksandar Sabev up for Bulgaria national under-21 football team for a match with Montenegro national under-21 football team.

Awards
CSKA Sofia
 Bulgarian Supercup: 2008

External links
 

1988 births
Living people
Bulgarian footballers
First Professional Football League (Bulgaria) players
PFC CSKA Sofia players
PFC Rilski Sportist Samokov players
FC Sportist Svoge players
PFC Kaliakra Kavarna players
FC Vitosha Bistritsa players
FC Chavdar Etropole players
Association football defenders